The Fairfield Stags baseball team is the college baseball team representing Fairfield University located in Fairfield, Connecticut. Fairfield competes in the Metro Atlantic Athletic Conference (MAAC) of NCAA Division I and plays their home games at the Alumni Baseball Diamond on the campus of Fairfield University. The Stags were MAAC Champions in 1983, 1991, 1993 and 2016.  Fairfield is currently coached by 3 time America East Coach of the Year and 2 time MAAC Coach of the Year Bill Currier.

History

Fairfield fielded its first varsity baseball team in 1951, winning 7 of 12 games.  The Stags, coached by Don Cook, made the first of three straight trips to the ECAC New England Tournament in 1977, defeating defending champion University of Maine. The team was MAAC South Champions in 1983, 1991, 1993, 1995 and 1997. In 2016, Fairfield won the MAAC regular season and tournament championships to advance to the Lubbock Super Regional of the 2016 NCAA Division I baseball tournament.

Individually, Anthony Hajjar was named a 2010 Louisville Slugger Freshman All-American; Peter Allen was named to the 2008 Brooks Wallace Player of the Year Watch List following his program record setting season in 2007 in which he was ranked nationally in doubles, batting average, and slugging percentage; and Mike Pike was named a 1993 Mizuno Freshman All-American.

Keefe Cato, the holder of ten Fairfield pitching records including seven career shutouts and one no-hitter, was the first Fairfield athlete to play in a major professional sport on the major league level after being selected by the Cincinnati Reds in the second round of the 1979 Major League Baseball Draft.  He was the Reds’ winning pitcher in his second game.  And Rob Gariano, who surpassed Cato's 31 year stand as  Fairfield's all-time strikeout leader with 293 strikeouts was drafted in the 36th round of the 2010 Major League Baseball Draft by the San Diego Padres.

Head coaches

Awards

All-Time statistic leaders

Stags in the MLB draft
The following Stag players were selected in the Major League Baseball draft:

See also
List of NCAA Division I baseball programs
Fairfield Stags

References

External links

Friends of Fairfield Baseball website